Haplogroup K2b2, in human genetics, may refer to:
 Haplogroup P (Y-DNA), a primary clade of Haplogroup K2b
 a rare subclade of Haplogroup K (mtDNA)